The mixed multi-discipline team event at the 2018 Summer Youth Olympics was held at the America Pavilion from 7 to 10 October.

Results

References

Mixed multi-discipline team